Rockingham is the fifth album by Nerf Herder, released in March 2016.

The album was crowdfunded using PledgeMusic. It was released digitally, on CD, and on Vinyl. There was a release party April 8, 2016, at the Troubadour (West Hollywood, California), Allie Goertz was a special guest.

Track listing

References

External links

2016 albums
Nerf Herder albums